The election for Governor of Ogun State took place on 9 March (postponed from 2 March). The election was held concurrently with various state-level elections. All Progressive Congress candidate Dapo Abiodun, who is a former senatorial aspirant and chairman of CAC, defeated Allied Peoples Movement candidate Adekunle Akinlade, African Democratic Congress candidate Gboyega Nasir Isiaka, Peoples Democratic Party candidate Buruji Kashamu and Action Democratic Party candidate Dimeji Bankole.

The Governor and Deputy Governor of Ogun State are elected on the same ticket.

APC primary

Candidates
Dapo Abiodun, Chairman board of CAC
Adekunle Akinlade, member of the House of Representatives
George Olatunji 
Jimi Lawal

PDP primary

Candidates
 Buruji Kashamu, Senator
 Ladi Adebutu, member of the House of Representatives
 Adeleke Shittu

Other contestants
 Prince Gboyega Nosiru Isiaka (ADC).
 Adekunle Akinlade (Allied People's Movement).
 Dimeji Bankole (ADP).
 Olatunde Rotimi Paseda (SDP).

 Oluseyi Olufade (Alliance for Democracy).
 Adesina Kowonise (Yes Electorates
Solidarity).
 Sir Tope Tokoya (Accord Party).

 Michael Adeeko (Unity Party of Nigeria).
 Olusegun Odegbami (Zenith Labour Party).
 Kunle Samson Elegbede (Democratic People’s Party).
 Nurudeen Oduwaiye (Mega Party of Nigeria).
 Adesegun Omowonula Taiwo (CAP).
 Lawal Abiola (People's Progressive Party).
 John Adegbola (Action Alliance).
 Olusegun Olufemi (Better Nigeria Progressives Party).
 Bello Akeem Alabi (Coalition for Change).
 Folakemi Eniola (African Action Congress).
 Ogunbiyi Bolanle (Progressives People’s Alliance).
 Olufemi Olomu (Alliance of Social Democratic).
 Oyefeso blessing (Justice Must Prevail Party).
 Adefioye Hamed (National Conscience Party).
 Adewale Omoniyi (Abundant Nigeria Renewal Party).
 Olufemi Onifade (FDP).
 Olayemi Olawale Olubunmi (All Grassroots Alliance).
 Sanyaolu Omolaja (Democratic Alternative).
 Engineer Abiodun Onabanjo (Rebuild).
 Reverend Emmanuel Okinoye (Freedom and Justice Party).
 Stephen Abiade (Advanced Congress of Democrats).
 Olufemi Falana (United People's Party).
 Akinboro Oluwole (People's Party of Nigeria).
 Adegbuyi Adebonojo (Young Progressives Party).
 Adetola Olusegun (People of Democratic Change).
 Mosuro Adebayo (Independent Democrats).
 Oduntan Adegbite (KOWA).
 Odejide Jimoh Adio (Democratic People’s Congress).
 Kassim Adunni (United Democratic Party).

General election

Results

See also
Nigerian National Assembly election, 2019 (Ogun State)

References

2019 Ogun State elections
Ogun State gubernatorial elections
Ogun State gubernatorial election
Ogun